IBX (official name: IBX Group AB) is a Swedish company that was established in 2000.

IBX supports large and medium-sized organisations in providing procurement expertise in terms of consulting, operational and strategic procurement services based on the IBX On-demand Platform technology.

Among the customers of IBX are companies from all sectors such as Ericsson, SEB, Volvo Group, Deutsche Post World Net, Skanska, Novo Nordisk, and Lufthansa.

In 2010, IBX Group was acquired by Capgemini.

In 2017, IBX Group was acquired by Tradeshift.

History

IBX was established in October 2000, through an initiative from Ericsson, SEB, b-business partners and the founders. The founders are Hans Ahlinder, Björn Böhme, Christer Hallqvist and Peter Lageson. The initial period was used to set up an application environment and to implement the two first customers: Ericsson and SEB. As a part of this, IBX signed agreements with SAP and Commerce One in November 2000.

Since 2001, IBX is continuously growing and present in other North European countries: Denmark, Norway (2001) and Finland (2002). IBX takes another step on the European market, when the company signs a five-year agreement with Deutsche Post World Net.

In March 2005, IBX acquires the German e-commerce company trimondo GmbH. The acquisition establishes IBX in Europe. In August 2006, IBX acquires German Portum AG, a supplier of web-based solutions for strategic purchasing (E-sourcing).

IBX has 232 employees in offices around the world and has operations in more than 80 different countries. IBX operated at the following locations: Stockholm-Bromma (headquarters), Copenhagen-Vallensbæk Strand, Helsinki, Oslo, Kraków (service desk), Paris (Capgemini) and Chicago.

In 2017, IBX was acquired by Tradeshift creating "the world’s largest business commerce platform connecting nearly 1.5 million businesses and more than 500 global enterprise customers that have access to the largest supply-chain app ecosystem".

Solutions and Services

IBX provides software as a service purchasing technology based on their IBX On-demand Platform. The scalable on-demand delivery model of IBX software for sourcing and procurement accelerates deployment and puts the emphasis on the users and the usage instead of technology issues. The benefits of an on-demand delivery model include lower upfront costs, lower total cost of ownership or a fast return on investment. In 2010, IBX joined forces with Capgemini in order to deliver an end-to-end BPO procurement solution that is called Procurement as a Service.

Publications
IBX publish the bi-annual purchasing professional journal Efficient Purchasing. Founded in 2005, the magazine released its tenth issue in the fall of 2010. Swedish business journalist Johan Beer is editor in chief.

In May 2008, IBX published the book Purchasing Transformation. The book provides new perspectives on how a purchasing function must adopt to a changing world.

Management

Management Team 
 Leif Bohlin, CEO
 René Hogenkamp, CFO
 Pontus Björnsson, Senior VP Marketing & Product Management
 Michael Worman, Head of Sales and Account Management
 Nicklas Brändström, Senior Vice President Application and Operation Management
 Veronica Wirén, HR Manager and Global HR Business Partner
 Björn Stenecker, VP Head of Professional Services

References

Software companies of Sweden
Companies related to the Wallenberg family
Information technology consulting firms of Sweden
Privately held companies of Sweden
Companies based in Stockholm